USS Douglas (PG-100) was an  which served in the United States Navy from 1971 to 1977.

Douglas was constructed by Tacoma Boatbuilding Co., of Tacoma, Washington.  She was launched on 19 June 1970 and commissioned as USS Douglas (PG-100) on 6 February 1971.

She spent the bulk of her career based in Naples, Italy, as part of a squadron of missile-armed gunboats participating in US and NATO exercises and operations in the Mediterranean.  She and the rest of the squadron were decommissioned on 1 October 1977 at Little Creek, Virginia.

She was stricken from the Navy Register on 1 October 1977 and was transferred to the David Taylor Naval Research and Development Center at Annapolis, Maryland.  She was then converted to a Research Vessel, renamed R/V Lauren and operated with the Naval Surface Warfare Center Panama City near Panama City, Florida.

Lauren was sunk on a sandbank, off the coast of North Carolina, on 30 April 2008 for use as a target for fighter pilots from Marine Corps Air Station Cherry Point in Havelock, North Carolina.

References

 

Gunboats of the United States Navy
Ships built by Tacoma Boatbuilding Company
1970 ships